Ausklang (German for 'concluding sound') is a work for piano and orchestra composed by Helmut Lachenmann in 1984/1985.


History 
It is a commission by the Westdeutscher Rundfunk. Lachenmann dedicated his work to pianist Yukiko Sugawara.

A performance takes about 50 minutes.

Discography 
 Massimiliano Damerini and the WDR Symphony Orchestra Cologne conducted by Péter Eötvös, 1994.
 Ueli Wiget and Ensemble Modern conducted by Markus Stenz, Ensemble Modern Medien, 2007.
 Pierre-Laurent Aimard and the Bavarian Radio Symphony Orchestra conducted by Jonathan Nott, Neos Musica Viva, 2015.

References

External links 
 , Aimard, BR Symphony, Nott

1986 compositions
Compositions that use extended techniques
Piano concertos
Music dedicated to ensembles or performers